Nectandra japurensis is a species of plant in the family Lauraceae. It is found in Brazil and Peru.

References

japurensis
Trees of Brazil
Trees of Peru
Trees of South America
Data deficient plants
Least concern biota of South America
Taxonomy articles created by Polbot